Ngouyo is a village located in Haut-Mbomou Prefecture, Central African Republic.

History 
Between 15 July and 20 November 2010, LRA militias attacked Ngouyo. They killed eight people, burned 35 houses, and kidnapped four people.

In December 2011, LRA raided Ngouyo twice. Due to the attack, UPDF soldiers were deployed to Ngouyo. Nevertheless, LRA carried out another three attacks in March 2012. On 9 March 2012, LRA bands abducted six people, five men and one woman, and looted property.

Facility 
Ngouyo has one health post.

References 

Populated places in Haut-Mbomou